Freya Piryns is a former Belgian politician and a member of the Groen political party.

Biography

She was born in Antwerp, Belgium on August 26, 1976. 
Her mother is Flemish television and film actress, Mia Van Roy and her father is the journalist Peter Piryns.

Career

She was elected Senator of the Belgian Senate in 2007 and reelected in 2010.

Timeline
10/06/2007 – :  Senator [directly elected] (Dutch electoral college)

Notes

Living people
Groen (political party) politicians
Members of the Belgian Federal Parliament
1976 births
People from Wilrijk
Politicians from Antwerp
21st-century Belgian politicians
21st-century Belgian women politicians